Klavdiya is a given name. Notable people with the name include:

Klavdiya Afanasyeva (born 1996), Russian racewalker
Klavdiya Blinova née Blinova (1920–1988), Soviet fighter pilot
Klavdiya Boyarskikh (1939–2009), Soviet cross-country skier
Klavdiya Kildsheva (1917–1994), Soviet and Russian test engineer
Klavdiya Kosenkova (born 1949), Lithuanian Olympic rower
Klavdiya Kuzmina (1923–2008), Soviet-Russian scientist
Klavdiya Latysheva (1897–1956), Soviet mathematician
Klavdiya Mayuchaya (1918–1989), Soviet track and field athlete, competed mainly in the javelin throw
Klavdiya Nazarova (1920–1942), Soviet organizer of an underground Komsomol partisan unit during WWII
Klavdiya Nechaeva (1916–1942), Soviet fighter pilot during World War II who was killed in action
Klavdiya Nikolayeva (1893–1944), Russian revolutionary, syndicalist, feminist, Old Bolshevik and Soviet politician
Klavdiya Plotnikova (1893–1989), the last living speaker of the Kamassian language
Klavdiya Shulzhenko (1906–1984), Soviet popular female singer and actress
Klavdiya Studennikova (born 1958), Ukrainian swimmer
Klavdiya Tochonova (1921–2004), Soviet track and field athlete, competed mainly in the shot put

See also
Klavdia